Jeff Balis (born April 13, 1975) is an American filmmaker whose directorial debut was the 2009 independent film Still Waiting..., starring John Michael Higgins.

Balis was a producer on the original Waiting....

References

External links
 
 

American film producers
American film directors
1975 births
Living people
Place of birth missing (living people)